Małgorzata Chojnacka (born February 17, 1983 in Gorzów Wielkopolski) is a Polish sprint canoer who has competed since the late 2000s. She won a complete set of medals at the ICF Canoe Sprint World Championships with a gold (K-2 1000 m: 2009), a silver (K-2 1000 m: 2007), and a bronze (K-4 500 m: 2007).

Chojnacka also competed in the K-1 500 m event at the 2008 Summer Olympics in Beijing, but was eliminated in the semifinals.

References

External links
 

1983 births
Canoeists at the 2008 Summer Olympics
Living people
Olympic canoeists of Poland
Polish female canoeists
Sportspeople from Gorzów Wielkopolski
ICF Canoe Sprint World Championships medalists in kayak
21st-century Polish women